is a railway station in the city of  Noda, Chiba, Japan, operated by the private railway operator Tōbu Railway. The station is numbered "TD-17".

Lines

Station layout
Nodashi Station has one island platform serving two tracks, connected to the station building by an underpass. The station is scheduled to be rebuilt as an elevated station by fiscal 2023.

Platforms

Adjacent stations

History

It was renamed Nodashi Station on May 30, 1950.

From 17 March 2012, station numbering was introduced on the Tobu Noda Line, with Nodashi Station becoming "TD-17".

Passenger statistics
In fiscal 2018, the station was used by an average of 10,099 passengers daily. The passenger figures for previous years are as shown below.

Surrounding area
Noda Post Office
Kikkoman Soy Sauce Museum

See also
 List of railway stations in Japan

References

External links

  

Railway stations in Chiba Prefecture
Stations of Tobu Railway
Tobu Noda Line
Railway stations in Japan opened in 1911
Noda, Chiba